The 2022–23 Toronto Raptors season is the 28th season of the franchise in the National Basketball Association (NBA).

Draft picks

The Raptors entered the draft with one second round pick.

Roster

Standings

Division

Conference

Record vs opponents

(* game decided in overtime)

Game log

Preseason

|-style="background:#ccffcc;"
| 1
| October 2
| Utah
| 
| Chris Boucher (11)
| Chris Boucher (10)
| Barnes, Wilson (3)
| Rogers Place17,100
| 1–0
|-style="background:#ccffcc;"
| 2
| October 5
| @ Boston
| 
| Achiuwa, Jackson, Siakam (13)
| D.J. Wilson (8)
| Jeff Dowtin (5)
| TD Garden19,156
| 2–0
|-style="background:#fcc;"
| 3 
| October 7 
| @ Houston
| 
| Pascal Siakam (18)
| Scottie Barnes (7)
| Banton, Barnes (4)
| Toyota Center10,902
| 2–1
|-style="background:#fcc;"
| 4
| October 9
| Chicago
| 
| Pascal Siakam (18)
| Pascal Siakam (9)
| Gary Trent Jr. (3)
| Scotiabank Arena16,559
| 2–2
|-style="background:#ccffcc;"
| 5
| October 14
| Boston
| 
| O.G. Anunoby (32)
| Achiuwa, Young (8)
| Fred VanVleet (7)
| Bell Centre21,900
| 3–2

Regular season

|-style="background:#cfc;"
| 1
| October 19
| Cleveland
| 
| Pascal Siakam (23)
| Pascal Siakam (11)
| Scottie Barnes (7)
| Scotiabank Arena19,800
| 1–0
|-style="background:#fcc;"
| 2
| October 21
| @ Brooklyn
| 
| Pascal Siakam (37)
| Pascal Siakam (13)
| Pascal Siakam (11)
| Barclays Center17,732
| 1–1
|-style="background:#fcc;"
| 3
| October 22 
| @ Miami
| 
| Siakam, Trent Jr. (23)
| Precious Achiuwa (11)
| Fred VanVleet (10)
| FTX Arena19,600
| 1–2
|-style="background:#cfc;"
| 4
| October 24
| @ Miami
| 
| Fred VanVleet (24)
| Precious Achiuwa (22)
| Fred VanVleet (9)
| FTX Arena19,600
| 2–2
|-style="background:#cfc;"
| 5
| October 26
| Philadelphia
| 
| Gary Trent Jr. (27)
| Scottie Barnes (10)
| Pascal Siakam (13)
| Scotiabank Arena19,800
| 3–2
|-style="background:#fcc;"
| 6
| October 28
| Philadelphia
| 
| Pascal Siakam (26)
| Pascal Siakam (10)
| Pascal Siakam (6)
| Scotiabank Arena19,800
| 3–3
|-style="background:#cfc;"
| 7
| October 31
| Atlanta
| 
| Pascal Siakam (31)
| Pascal Siakam (12)
| Scottie Barnes (8)
| Scotiabank Arena19,800
| 4–3

|-style="background:#cfc;"
| 8
| November 2
| @ San Antonio
| 
| Gary Trent Jr. (24)
| Pascal Siakam (10)
| Pascal Siakam (11)
| AT&T Center12,155
| 5–3
|-style="background:#fcc;"
| 9
| November 4
| @ Dallas
| 
| O.G. Anunoby (27)
| Scottie Barnes (11)
| Scottie Barnes (10)
| American Airlines Center20,177
| 5–4
|-style="background:#cfc;"
| 10
| November 6
| Chicago
| 
| Fred VanVleet (30)
| Scottie Barnes (10)
| Fred VanVleet (11)
| Scotiabank Arena19,800
| 6–4
|-style="background:#fcc;"
| 11
| November 7
| @ Chicago
| 
| Fred VanVleet (27)
| Scottie Barnes (6)
| Scottie Barnes (5)
| United Center21,142
| 6–5
|-style="background:#cfc;"
| 12
| November 9
| Houston
| 
| Fred VanVleet (32)
| O.G. Anunoby (10)
| Scottie Barnes (5)
| Scotiabank Arena19,800
| 7–5
|-style="background:#fcc;"
| 13
| November 11
| @ Oklahoma City
| 
| Chris Boucher (20)
| Chris Boucher (12)
| Banton, Barnes (4)
| Paycom Center16,104
| 7–6
|-style="background:#fcc;"
| 14
| November 12
| @ Indiana
| 
| O.G. Anunoby (26)
| Scottie Barnes (9)
| Scottie Barnes (5)
| Gainbridge Fieldhouse13,089
| 7–7
|-style="background:#cfc;"
| 15
| November 14
| @ Detroit
| 
| Dalano Banton (27)
| O.G. Anunoby (7)
| Banton, Barnes, Flynn, Young (4)
| Little Caesars Arena16,988
| 8–7
|-style="background:#cfc;"
| 16
| November 16
| Miami
| 
| O.G. Anunoby (32)
| Anunoby, Boucher (10)
| Fred VanVleet (8)
| Scotiabank Arena19,800
| 9–7
|-style="background:#fcc;"
| 17
| November 19
| @ Atlanta
| 
| Scottie Barnes (28)
| Barnes, Koloko (11)
| Scottie Barnes (9)
| State Farm Arena18,051
| 9–8
|-style="background:#fcc;"
| 18
| November 23
| Brooklyn
|
| Gary Trent Jr. (19)
| Chris Boucher (16)
| Thaddeus Young (5)
| Scotiabank Arena19,800
| 9–9
|-style="background:#cfc;"
| 19
| November 26
| Dallas
|
| Anunoby, VanVleet (26)
| Chris Boucher (13)
| Fred VanVleet (7)
| Scotiabank Arena19,800
| 10–9
|-style="background:#cfc;"
| 20
| November 28
| Cleveland
|
| O.G. Anunoby (20)
| Pascal Siakam (11)
| Barnes, Siakam, VanVleet (5)
| Scotiabank Arena19,800
| 11–9
|-style="background:#fcc;"
| 21
| November 30
| @ New Orleans
| 
| Gary Trent Jr. (35)
| Siakam, VanVleet (6)
| Fred VanVleet (6)
| Smoothie King Center14,845
| 11–10

|-style="background:#fcc;"
| 22
| December 2
| @ Brooklyn
|
| Pascal Siakam (24)
| Barnes, Koloko (9)
| Fred VanVleet (6)
| Barclays Center17,732
| 11–11
|-style="background:#cfc;"
| 23
| December 3
| Orlando
|
| O.G. Anunoby (32)
| Scottie Barnes (14)
| Pascal Siakam (10)
| Scotiabank Arena19,800
| 12–11
|-style="background:#fcc;"
| 24
| December 5
| Boston
| 
| Pascal Siakam (29)
| Chris Boucher (9)
| Pascal Siakam (7)
| Scotiabank Arena19,800
| 12–12
|-style="background:#cfc;"
| 25
| December 7
| L.A. Lakers
|
| Siakam, VanVleet (25)
| Scottie Barnes (17)
| Siakam, VanVleet (7)
| Scotiabank Arena19,800
| 13–12
|-style="background:#fcc;"
| 26
| December 9
| @ Orlando
|
| Pascal Siakam (36)
| Pascal Siakam (9)
| Pascal Siakam (7)
| Amway Center17,008
| 13–13
|-style="background:#fcc;"
| 27
| December 11
| @ Orlando
|
| Gary Trent Jr. (24)
| Pascal Siakam (6)
| Siakam, VanVleet (7)
| Amway Center16,891
| 13–14
|-style="background:#fcc;"
| 28
| December 14
| Sacramento
|
| Fred VanVleet (39)
| Fred VanVleet (8)
| Scottie Barnes (10)
| Scotiabank Arena19,800
| 13–15
|-style="background:#fcc;"
| 29
| December 16
| Brooklyn
|
| Fred VanVleet (39)
| Pascal Siakam (7)
| Pascal Siakam (5)
| Scotiabank Arena19,800
| 13–16
|-style="background:#fcc;"
| 30
| December 18
| Golden State
| 
| Pascal Siakam (27)
| Chris Boucher (14)
| Fred VanVleet (8)
| Scotiabank Arena19,800
| 13–17
|-style="background:#fcc;"
| 31
| December 19
| @ Philadelphia
| 
| Pascal Siakam (38)
| Pascal Siakam (15)
| Pascal Siakam (6)
| Wells Fargo Center20,408
| 13–18
|-style="background:#cfc;"
| 32
| December 21 
| @ New York
| 
| Pascal Siakam (52)
| Pascal Siakam (9)
| Pascal Siakam (7)
| Madison Square Garden19,294
| 14–18
|-style="background:#cfc;"
| 33
| December 23
| @ Cleveland
|
| Anunoby, Siakam (26)
| Scottie Barnes (10)
| Pascal Siakam (9)
| Rocket Mortgage FieldHouse19,432
| 15–18
|-style="background:#fcc;"
| 34
| December 27
| L.A. Clippers
| 
| Pascal Siakam (36)
| Scottie Barnes (12)
| Scottie Barnes (8)
| Scotiabank Arena19,800
| 15–19
|-style="background:#fcc;"
| 35
| December 29
| Memphis
| 
| Pascal Siakam (25)
| Barnes, Siakam (10)
| Malachi Flynn (5)
| Scotiabank Arena19,800
| 15–20
|-style="background:#cfc;"
| 36
| December 30 
| Phoenix
| 
| Gary Trent Jr.(35)
| Anunoby, Barnes, Trent Jr. (5)
| Pascal Siakam (6)
| Scotiabank Arena19,800
| 16–20

|-style="background:#fcc;"
| 37
| January 2
| @ Indiana
|
| Gary Trent Jr. (32)
| Anunoby, Barnes (8)
| Scottie Barnes (8)
| Gainbridge Fieldhouse14,054
| 16–21
|-style="background:#fcc;"
| 38
| January 4
| Milwaukee
|
| Fred VanVleet (28)
| O.G. Anunoby (9)
| Fred VanVleet (12)
| Scotiabank Arena19,800
| 16–22
|-style="background:#fcc;"
| 39
| January 6
| New York
| 
| Fred VanVleet (28)
| Pascal Siakam (13)
| Fred VanVleet (7)
| Scotiabank Arena19,800
| 16–23
|-style="background:#cfc;"
| 40
| January 8
| Portland
| 
| Pascal Siakam (27)
| Scottie Barnes (9)
| Fred VanVleet (7)
| Scotiabank Arena19,800
| 17–23
|-style="background:#cfc;"
| 41
| January 10
| Charlotte
| 
| Pascal Siakam (28)
| Koloko, Siakam (8)
| Fred VanVleet (8)
| Scotiabank Arena19,800
| 18–23
|-style="background:#cfc;"
| 42
| January 12
| Charlotte
| 
| Pascal Siakam (35)
| Barnes, Siakam (7)
| Scottie Barnes (9)
| Scotiabank Arena19,800
| 19–23
|-style="background:#fcc;"
| 43
| January 14
| Atlanta
| 
| Scottie Barnes (27)
| Scottie Barnes (12)
| Pascal Siakam (6)
| Scotiabank Arena19,800
| 19–24
|-style="background:#cfc;"
| 44
| January 16
| @ New York
| 
| Fred VanVleet (33)
| Achiuwa, Siakam (8)
| Pascal Siakam (9)
| Madison Square Garden19,812
| 20–24
|-style="background:#fcc;"
| 45
| January 17
| @ Milwaukee
| 
| Fred VanVleet (39)
| Scottie Barnes (13)
| Fred VanVleet (7)
| Fiserv Forum17,341
| 20–25
|-style="background:#fcc;"
| 46
| January 19
| @ Minnesota
| 
| Scottie Barnes (29)
| Anunoby, Barnes (8)
| Fred VanVleet (10)
| Target Center16,318
| 20–26
|-style="background:#fcc;"
| 47
| January 21
| Boston
| 
| Pascal Siakam (29)
| Precious Achiuwa (11)
| Pascal Siakam (10)
| Scotiabank Arena19,800
| 20–27
|-style="background:#cfc;"
| 48
| January 22
| New York
| 
| Fred VanVleet (28)
| Precious Achiuwa (11)
| Barnes, Siakam (6)
| Scotiabank Arena19,261
| 21–27
|-style="background:#cfc;"
| 49
| January 25
| @ Sacramento
| 
| Pascal Siakam (26)
| Pascal Siakam (11)
| Scottie Barnes (10)
| Golden 1 Center17,767
| 22–27
|-style="background:#fcc;"
| 50
| January 27
| @ Golden State
| 
| Fred VanVleet (28)
| Precious Achiuwa (11)
| Fred VanVleet (10)
| Chase Center18,064
| 22–28
|-style="background:#cfc;"
| 51
| January 28
| @ Portland
| 
| Precious Achiuwa (27)
| Precious Achiuwa (13)
| Fred VanVleet (9)
| Moda Center19,393
| 23–28
|-style="background:#fcc;"
| 52
| January 30
| @ Phoenix
| 
| Fred VanVleet (24)
| Precious Achiuwa (12)
| Fred VanVleet (9)
| Footprint Center17,071
| 23–29

|-style="background:#fcc;"
| 53
| February 1
| @ Utah
| 
| Fred VanVleet (34)
| Scottie Barnes (14)
| Fred VanVleet (10)
| Vivint Arena18,206
| 23–30
|-style="background:#cfc;"
| 54
| February 3
| @ Houston
| 
| Fred VanVleet (32)
| Achiuwa, Boucher (8)
| Barnes, Siakam, VanVleet (4)
| Toyota Center16,585
| 24–30
|-style="background:#cfc;"
| 55
| February 5
| @ Memphis
| 
| Pascal Siakam (19)
| Chris Boucher (10)
| Fred VanVleet (7)
| FedEx Forum17,794
| 25–30
|-style="background:#cfc;"
| 56
| February 8
| San Antonio
| 
| Pascal Siakam (37)
| Chris Boucher (11)
| Pascal Siakam (7)
| Scotiabank Arena19 800
| 26–30
|-style="background:#fcc;"
| 57
| February 10
| Utah
| 
| Pascal Siakam (35)
| Scottie Barnes (7)
| Scottie Barnes (9)
| Scotiabank Arena19,800
| 26–31
|-style="background:#cfc;"
| 58
| February 12
| Detroit
| 
| Fred VanVleet (35)
| Precious Achiuwa (11)
| Fred VanVleet (8)
| Scotiabank Arena19,800
| 27–31
|-style="background:#cfc;"
| 59
| February 14
| Orlando
| 
| Jakob Pöltl (30)
| Precious Achiuwa (13)
| Fred VanVleet (15)
| Scotiabank Arena19,800
| 28–31
|-style="background:#cfc;"
| 60
| February 23
| New Orleans
| 
| Pascal Siakam (26)
| Jakob Pöltl (18)
| Pascal Siakam (5)
| Scotiabank Arena19,800
| 29–31
|-style="background:#cfc;"
| 61
| February 25
| @ Detroit
| 
| Pascal Siakam (29)
| Jakob Pöltl (14)
| Pascal Siakam (5)
| Little Caesars Arena20,190
| 30–31
|-style="background:#fcc;"
| 62
| February 26
| @ Cleveland
| 
| Pascal Siakam (25)
| Jakob Pöltl (9)
| Barnes, Siakam (5)
| Rocket Mortgage FieldHouse19,,432
| 30–32
|-style="background:#cfc;"
| 63
| February 28
| Chicago
| 
| Pascal Siakam (20)
| Anunoby, Barnes, Siakam (8)
| Fred VanVleet (9)
| Scotiabank Arena19,800
| 31–32

|-style="background:#fcc;"
| 64
| March 2
| @ Washington
| 
| O.G. Anunoby (26)
| Jakob Pöltl (13)
| Fred VanVleet (8)
| Capital One Arena14,643
| 31–33
|-style="background:#cfc;"
| 65
| March 4
| @ Washington
| 
| Gary Trent Jr. (26)
| Pöltl, Trent Jr. (5)
| Fred VanVleet (10)
| Capital One Arena18,174
| 32–33
|-style="background:#fcc;"
| 66
| March 6
| @ Denver
| 
| Fred VanVleet (21)
| Barnes, Pöltl (9)
| Fred VanVleet (14)
| Ball Arena19,520
| 32–34
|-style="background:#fcc;"
| 67
| March 8
| @ L.A. Clippers
| 
| Barnes, Siakam (20)
| Jakob Pöltl (11)
| Fred VanVleet (9)
| Crypto.com Arena19,068
| 32–35
|-style="background:#fcc;"
| 68
| March 10
| @ L.A. Lakers
| 
| Scottie Barnes (32)
| Jakob Pöltl (10)
| Fred VanVleet (10)
| Crypto.com Arena18,322
| 32–36
|-style="background:#cfc;"
| 69
| March 14
| Denver
| 
| Fred VanVleet (36)
| Jakob Pöltl (11)
| Fred VanVleet (7)
| Scotiabank Arena19,800
| 33–36
|-style="background:#cfc;"
| 70
| March 16
| Oklahoma City
| 
| Pascal Siakam (25)
| Pascal Siakam (14)
| Pascal Siakam (8)
| Scotiabank Arena19,800
| 34–36
|-style="background:#cfc;"
| 71
| March 18
| Minnesota
| 
| Fred VanVleet (28) 
| Jakob Pöltl (11)
| Fred VanVleet (7)
| Scotiabank Arena19,800
| 35–36
|-style="background:#fcc;"
| 72
| March 19
| @ Milwaukee
| 
| Fred VanVleet (23) 
| Pascal Siakam (12)
| Fred VanVleet (11)
| Fiserv Forum17,341
| 35–37
|-style="background:#;"
| 73
| March 22
| Indiana
|
|
|
|
| Scotiabank Arena
|
|-style="background:#;"
| 74
| March 24
| Detroit
|
|
|
|
| Scotiabank Arena
|
|-style="background:#;"
| 75
| March 26
| Washington
|
|
|
|
| Scotiabank Arena
|
|-style="background:#;"
| 76
| March 28
| Miami
|
|
|
|
| Scotiabank Arena
|
|-style="background:#;"
| 77
| March 31
| @ Philadelphia
|
|
|
|
| Wells Fargo Center
|

|-style="background:#;"
| 78
| April 2
| @ Charlotte
|
|
|
|
| Spectrum Center
|
|-style="background:#;"
| 79
| April 4
| @ Charlotte
|
|
|
|
| Spectrum Center
|
|-style="background:#;"
| 80
| April 5
| @ Boston
|
|
|
|
| TD Garden
|
|-style="background:#;"
| 81
| April 7
| @ Boston
|
|
|
|
| TD Garden
|
|-style="background:#;"
| 82
| April 9
| Milwaukee
| 
|
|
| 
| Scotiabank Arena

Transactions

Trades

Free agency

Re-signed

Additions

Subtractions

References

Toronto Raptors seasons
Toronto Raptors
Toronto Raptors
Toronto Raptors
Tor